A112 may refer to:

Autobianchi A112 (also known as the Lancia A112), a car
A112 road (Great Britain)